The 2016–17 season of the Turkish Women's First Football League was the 21st season of Turkey's premier women's football league.

Teams

First stage

Table

Results

1 - won by default
2 - default

Second stage
For the second stage points won in the first stage were halved.

Play Off

Table

Results

Play Out

Table

Results

Topscorers

Hat-tricks

References

External links
 Kadınlar 1. Ligi 2016 - 2017 Sezonu 
 Season on soccerway.com

2016
2016–17 domestic women's association football leagues
Women's